The following is a list of people who were born in and/or have lived in the American city of Olathe, Kansas.

Academia
 George Washington Carver (1860–1943), botanist, prominent African American leader
 J. Wayne Reitz (1908–1993), President of the University of Florida (1955–1967)
 Charles H. Zimmerman (1908–1996), aeronautical engineer

Arts and entertainment

Film, television, and theatre
 Willie Aames (1960– ), actor
 Jennifer Bertrand, interior designer, television show host
 Adam Jamal Craig (1981– ), actor
 Ashley Litton (1983– ), beauty queen
 Michael McMillian (1978– ), actor
 Larry Parks (1914–1975), actor
 Chris Porter (1979– ), comedian
 Charles "Buddy" Rogers (1904–1999), actor

Journalism
 C. L. Edson (1881–1975), newspaper columnist, humorist, and poet

 Dan Ryckert (1984– ), journalist and author.

Music
 Johnny Dare (1968– ), Kansas City radio personality
 Charles Miller (1939–1980), musician
 Rob Pope, member of emo band The Get Up Kids
 Ryan Pope (1978– ), member of emo band The Get Up Kids
 Richie Pratt (1943–2015), jazz drummer, professional football player
 Jim Suptic (1977– ), member of emo band The Get Up Kids

Other visual arts
Grace Bilger (1907–2000), painter

Business
 Jesse Clyde Nichols (1880–1950), real estate developer
 Donald J. Tyson (1930–2011), food industry executive

Politics

National
 Chauncey B. Little (1877–1952), U.S. Representative from Kansas
 Edward C. Little (1858–1924), U.S. Representative from Kansas
 James Kenneth Logan (1929– ), U.S. federal judge
 Walter Lewis McVey Jr. (1922–2014), U.S. Representative from Kansas
 Vince Snowbarger (1949– ), U.S. Representative from Kansas (1997–1999)

State
 John Anderson Jr. (1917–2014), 36th Governor of Kansas (1961–1965)
 Keith Esau, Kansas state legislator
 Herbert S. Hadley (1872–1927), 32nd Governor of Missouri, chancellor of Washington University in St. Louis
 George H. Hodges (1866–1947), 19th Governor of Kansas
 Julia Lynn (1957– ), Kansas state legislator
 Robert Montgomery, Kansas state legislator
 Robert Olson (1969– ), Kansas state legislator
 Mark Parkinson (1957– ), 45th Governor of Kansas (2009–2011)
 Ron Ryckman Jr., Kansas state legislator
 John St. John (1833–1916), 8th Governor of Kansas (1879–1883), Prohibition Party Presidential candidate (1884)
 Harold Sebring (1898–1968), Florida Supreme Court justice

Local
 Albert I. Beach (1883–1939), 42nd Mayor of Kansas City, Missouri

Sports

American football

 Arland Bruce III (1977– ), wide receiver for the BC Lions
 Don Davis (1972– ), linebacker, coach
 Bryan Shepherd (1991– ), cornerback
 Isaiah Simmons (1998– ), linebacker
 Darren Sproles (1983– ), running back

Baseball
 Dan Glass (1959– ), Kansas City Royals president
 Claude Hendrix (1889–1944), pitcher
 Dummy Taylor (1875–1958), pitcher

Basketball
 Manute Bol (1962–2010), NBA center (1985–1994)
 Willie Cauley-Stein (1993– ), center
 Danielle McCray (1987– ), forward

Other
 Johnny Carver (1995– ), sports author 
 Stevana Case (1976– ), professional video gamer
 Steve Fisher (1982– ), snowboarder
 Eric Lynch (1978– ), poker player
 Michael Thomas (1988– ), soccer midfielder

See also

 List of MidAmerica Nazarene Pioneers head football coaches
 List of people from Johnson County, Kansas

References

Olathe, Kansas
Olathe